Kawanaka (written: 川中) is a Japanese surname. Notable people with the surname include:

, Japanese archer
, Japanese swimmer
, Japanese enka singer

Japanese-language surnames